Ampullina is an extinct taxonomic genus of deep-water sea snails, marine gastropod molluscs in the clade Caenogastropoda. These sea snails were epifaunal grazers. They lived from the Middle Triassic period to the Lower Pliocene age.

Species
 Ampullina aethiopica Jaboli, 1959
 Ampullina anguillana Cooke, 1919
 Ampullina bravoensis Olsson, 1931
 Ampullina butleri McNamara & Kendrick, 1994
 Ampullina effusa Tate, 1893
 † Ampullina? multistriata (Baily, 1855) 
 Ampullina ortoni Gabb, 1870
 Ampullina packardi Popenoe, 1937
 Ampullina paracasina Rivera, 1957
 Ampullina pichinka Cataldo & Lazo, 2016
 Ampullina solidula Dall, 1892
 Ampullina subhumerosa White, 1887
 Ampullina vaughani Cooke, 1928
 Ampullina woodsi Hanna & Israelsky, 1925
 Natica (Ampullina) gabbi Clark, 1917

References

Ampullina in the Paleobiology Database
Sepkoski, Jack Sepkoski's Online Genus Database

Ampullina